WJQI may refer to:

 WQEZ, a radio station (1370 AM) licensed to Fort Campbell, Kentucky, which held the call sign WJQI from 2005 to 2009
 WCPK, a radio station (1600 AM) licensed to Chesapeake, Virginia, which held the call sign WJQI from 1987 to 1996
 WPTE, a radio station (94.9 AM) licensed to Virginia Beach, Virginia, which held the call sign WJQI from 1987 to 1996